The  is a kofun burial mound located in the Atago neighborhood of the city of Mito in Ibaraki Prefecture in the northern Kantō region of Japan. It received protection as a National Historic Site in 1934.

Overview
The Atagoyama Kofun is located on a river terrace on the west bank of the Nakagawa River at an elevation of 40 meters. It is also one the largest found in Ibaraki Prefecture. 

The tumulus is well-preserved, but the moat has mostly been filled in and is occupied by private residences. The kofun is named for a Shinto Shrine, and Atago Shrine located at its summit.

The interior of the tomb has not been excavated, but fragments of Sue ware pottery have been found in the vicinity in 1978 survey. Large cylindrical haniwa were found on the ridges and skirts of the posterior part of the posterior dome, so it is estimated that there were originally 3 to 4 rows of haniwa. From the style of the haniwa it is believed to have been built in the early 6th century as the tomb of Takekashima-no-mikoto, the Kuni no miyatsuko of the "Nakanokuni", whose territories existed on either side of the Naka River. 

The tumulus is one of a cluster of kofun in the vicinity, which were not accorded protected status. The tumulus is a five-minute walk from the "Hakamatsuka 2-chome” bus stop on the Ibaraki Kotsu Bus from Mito Station.

Total length 136.5 meters
Anterior rectangular portion 73 meters wide x 9 meters high
Posterior circular portion 78 meter diameter x 10 meters high

See also

List of Historic Sites of Japan (Ibaraki)

References

External links
 Ibaraki Tourist Information 
Ibaraki Prefectural Board of Education 
Mito City official site 

Kofun
History of Ibaraki Prefecture
Mito, Ibaraki
Historic Sites of Japan
Hitachi Province